When a Man's a Man is a 1935 American Western film directed by Edward F. Cline and written by Frank Mitchell Dazey and Agnes Christine Johnston. The film stars George O'Brien, Dorothy Wilson, Paul Kelly, Harry Woods, Jimmy Butler and Richard Carlyle. The film was released on February 15, 1935, by Fox Film Corporation.

Parts of the film were shot in Zion National Park.

Plot

Cast
George O'Brien as Larry Knight
Dorothy Wilson as Kitty Baldwin
Paul Kelly as Phil Acton
Harry Woods as Nick Gambert
Jimmy Butler as Newsboy Jimmy
Richard Carlyle as Dean Baldwin
Clarence Wilson as Garvey
Edgar Norton as Servant Gibbs

References

External links 
 

1935 films
Fox Film films
American Western (genre) films
1935 Western (genre) films
Films directed by Edward F. Cline
American black-and-white films
Films shot in Utah
Films produced by Sol Lesser
Films based on American novels
Remakes of American films
Sound film remakes of silent films
1930s English-language films
1930s American films